Ashtabula is a genus of jumping spiders that was first described by G. W. Peckham & E. G. Peckham in 1894.

Species
 it contains nine species, found in Central America, Colombia, Brazil, Uruguay, Venezuela, and Mexico:
Ashtabula bicristata (Simon, 1901) – Venezuela
Ashtabula cuprea Mello-Leitão, 1946 – Uruguay
Ashtabula dentata F. O. Pickard-Cambridge, 1901 – Guatemala to Panama
Ashtabula dentichelis Simon, 1901 – Venezuela
Ashtabula furcillata Crane, 1949 – Venezuela
Ashtabula glauca Simon, 1901 – Mexico
Ashtabula montana Chickering, 1946 – Panama
Ashtabula sexguttata Simon, 1901 – Brazil
Ashtabula zonura Peckham & Peckham, 1894 (type) – Colombia

References

Salticidae
Salticidae genera
Spiders of Central America
Spiders of Mexico
Spiders of South America